Alexander Larman (born 29 November 1981) is a British author, journalist, historian, and literary editor of The Spectator World. A writer of multiple historical biographies, including those of John Wilmot, 2nd Earl of Rochester, Lord Byron and Edward VIII, he is also a regular contributor to The Times, The Observer, The Times Literary Supplement, The Spectator, the New Statesman, and  The Daily Telegraph.

Career

His first book, Blazing Star: The Life and Times of John Wilmot, 2nd Earl of Rochester, was published in 2014, and led to a public dispute with the historian Cliff Davies. His second book, Restoration, a social history of the year 1666, was published in 2016. His third, Byron's Women, came out in 2016 and was shortlisted for the Elma Dangerfield Prize. Larman previously served as literary editor of The Chap magazine. His fourth book, The Crown In Crisis: Countdown to the Abdication, an account of the Edward VIII abdication crisis of 1936, was published by Weidenfeld & Nicolson in 2020. It attracted significant global media attention due to Larman's discovery of new documents relating to the July 1936 assassination attempt on Edward VIII by George McMahon. His next two books, The Windsors at War: The Nazi Threat to the Crown and Power and Glory: The Era of Elizabeth will focus on the Royal Family between Edward VIII's abdication and the coronation of Elizabeth II, and will be published in March 2023 and spring 2024.

Reception
Writing in The Times, Matthew Dennison writes, of Blazing Star, that "Larman is at pains to rescue his subject from his status as one-dimensional bad boy ... He mostly succeeds," praising the book as "engagingly partisan and elegantly informative." In The Guardian, Ian Thomson states that though "The biography is not without its faults ...  Larman takes us through the high adventure of Rochester's life and loves" and "paints a picture of a great poet who flared brightly before burning out."

Writing on Restoration, Ben East (also for The Guardian) similarly concludes that though it "perhaps lacks the depth that the period requires ... [it] is an accessible snapshot of Restoration England, which manages to give labourers and royalty equal billing."

Claire Kohnda Hazelton, in The Observer, noted that in Byron's Women "Larman explores not only each woman’s relationship with Byron but her ambitions, achievements and passions. Larman also sheds light upon Byron’s violent nature." She concludes that "This is no ordinary biography; through exploring the lives of the women in his life and the impressions he left upon them, we are offered an outline of Byron’s person, arguably more accurate, compelling and candid than any portrait focused on him and his poetry could be." Roger Lewis wrote in The Times that 'It isn’t a tiresome feminist rant, as from a pushy university lecturer, it is humane and brooks no balderdash. This radical questioning of the conventional swashbuckling Byronic stance is convincing.'

The Crown in Crisis received a starred review from Kirkus Reviews and was the Times Book of the Week, later being highlighted by them as one of the best books of the summer, and finally as one of their best books of 2020 overall. Moira Hodgson wrote in the Wall Street Journal that 'Mr. Larman brings his cast of characters vividly to life in a fast-paced, lively staging of the drama. It’s as much fun to read as a good political thriller.' David Aaronovitch described Larman as 'amiable and talented' and the book as 'always interesting'. Kathryn Hughes, writing in The Guardian, named The Crown in Crisis as The Guardian'''s Book of the Day, noting that Larman "doesn’t go in for startling revisions, but instead makes use of the new sources and interpretive lenses that have become available in the intervening four decades" and that he "shows a delicate touch too in not banging home the obvious contemporary resonances." Eva Waite-Taylor, in the Independent, wrote that "it's an engaging, detailed, and suspenseful read; one that is equal parts empathetic and entertaining. You will be gripped." And Hephzibah Anderson described the book in The Observer'' as 'An enduringly relevant chapter of British history, brought to life with panache', and praised its 'impressive suspense.'

Personal life

Larman attended Winchester College and Regent's Park College, Oxford, where he read English and graduated with a First. His father-in-law was the Stirling Prize award-winning architect Will Alsop.

References

Living people
British historians
People educated at Winchester College
Alumni of Regent's Park College, Oxford
1981 births